Thomas Michael Ackerman (September 6, 1972) is a former American football center in the NFL. He was drafted by the New Orleans Saints in the fifth round of the 1996 NFL Draft out of Eastern Washington University. He played for the Saints for the next 6 seasons. After the Saints, he signed with the Tennessee Titans and played for them for the next two seasons.

External links
Official Bio
SI bio
High School Statistics

1972 births
Players of American football from Washington (state)
American football centers
Eastern Washington Eagles football players
Living people
New Orleans Saints players
Sportspeople from Bellingham, Washington
Tennessee Titans players